The Best of Leonard Cohen is a greatest hits album by Leonard Cohen, released in 1975. In some European countries, it was released under the title Greatest Hits. This alternative title was used for the original vinyl release and for CD reissues from the 1980s onwards.

Background
According to Ira Nadel's 1996 Cohen memoir Various Positions, Cohen agreed to the project because there was a new generation of listeners and he was given complete artistic control; he picked the songs, designed the package, and insisted that the lyrics be included.  The album was not a hit in the United States but did well in Europe, Cohen's major market at the time.  He toured in support of the album in 1976, beginning in Berlin on April 22 and ending in London on July 7.  It was during this tour that Cohen recorded the funky, disco-infused "Do I Have To Dance All Night" at Musicland Studios.  The single was only released in Europe.

Artwork
The front cover photograph was taken in 1968 in a Milan hotel room by a Gino, according to Cohen's liner notes. Alternative rock band Ween based the album cover for their 1991 album, The Pod, after this photograph.

2009 release
In July 2009, this compilation was re-released in England under the title Greatest Hits with updated artwork and a revised track listing. Four tracks from the original 1975 version ("Lady Midnight", "The Partisan", "Last Year's Man" and "Take This Longing") were removed and nine tracks released after 1975 ("Everybody Knows", "Waiting for the Miracle", "A Thousand Kisses Deep", "The Future", "Closing Time", "Dance Me to the End of Love", "First We Take Manhattan", "I'm Your Man" and "Hallelujah") were added.

Track listings

1975 release
 "Suzanne" – 3:50
 "Sisters of Mercy" – 3:36
 "So Long, Marianne" – 5:40
 "Bird on the Wire" – 3:27
 "Lady Midnight" – 2:58
 "The Partisan" – 3:25
 "Hey, That's No Way to Say Goodbye" – 2:57
 "Famous Blue Raincoat" – 5:09
 "Last Year's Man" – 5:59
 "Chelsea Hotel #2" – 3:07
 "Who by Fire" – 2:32
 "Take This Longing" – 4:05

2009 release
"Suzanne" – 3:48
"So Long, Marianne" – 5:36
"Sisters of Mercy" – 3:33
"Famous Blue Raincoat" – 5:07
"Everybody Knows" – 5:34
"Waiting for the Miracle" – 3:24
"Who by Fire" – 2:33
"Chelsea Hotel #2" – 3:05
"Hey, That's No Way to Say Goodbye" – 2:54
"Bird on the Wire" – 3:25
"A Thousand Kisses Deep" – 6:26
"The Future" – 6:40
"Closing Time" – 5:58
"Dance Me to the End of Love" – 4:38
"First We Take Manhattan" – 5:50
"I'm Your Man" – 4:26
"Hallelujah" – 4:38

Year-end charts

Certifications and sales

References

1975 greatest hits albums
Leonard Cohen compilation albums
Columbia Records compilation albums